This is a list of Maldivian films released in 2013.

Releases

Theatre releases

Short film

Television

References

External links

Maldivian
2013